Sir Phillip James Macdonell (10 January 1873 – 15 December 1940) was the 25th Chief Justice of Ceylon. He was appointed in 1930 succeeding Stanley Fisher and was Chief Justice until 1936. He was succeeded by Sidney Abrahams.

Career
Macdonell was a scholar at Brasenose College, Oxford, was Bacon Scholar at Gray's Inn in 1896, and was called to the Bar there in January 1900.

He was 
 war correspondent for "The Times", 1900–1901; 
 Judge of the High Court, Northern Rhodesia, 1918–1927; 
 President of the West Indian Court of Appeal, Chief Justice of Trinidad and Tobago 1927–30 
 Chief Justice of Ceylon, 1930–36; Privy Counsellor, 1939 
 Knighted, 1925; 
 Retired, 1936. 
 President of the Balovale Commission (Northern Rhodesia, 1939–41).

He died in Southport in 1940 and was buried in Girthon Old Churchyard, Kirkcudbrightshire He had married Alexandrina Sutherland Campbell.

References

British war correspondents
1873 births
1940 deaths
Members of the Privy Council of the United Kingdom
Chief Justices of British Ceylon
19th-century British people
20th-century Sri Lankan people
19th-century Sri Lankan people
British expatriates in Sri Lanka
Chief justices of Trinidad and Tobago
Northern Rhodesia judges
British India judges
British Trinidad and Tobago judges
The Times journalists
West Indian Court of Appeal judges